HMS Vanguard was a British fast battleship built during the Second World War and commissioned after the war ended. She was the largest and fastest of the Royal Navy's battleships, the only ship of her class, and the last battleship to be built.

The Royal Navy anticipated being outnumbered by the combined German and Japanese battleships in the early 1940s, and had therefore started building the s. However, the time-consuming construction of the triple- turrets for the Lion class would delay their completion until 1943 at the earliest. The British had enough  guns and turrets in storage to allow one ship of a modified Lion-class design with four twin-15-inch turrets to be completed faster than the Lion-class vessels that had already been laid down. Work on Vanguard was started and stopped several times during the war, and her design was revised several times during her construction to reflect war experience. These stoppages and changes prevented her from being completed before the end of the war.

Vanguards first task after completing her sea trial at the end of 1946 was, early the next year, to convey King George VI and his family on the first Royal Tour of South Africa by a reigning monarch. While refitting after her return, she was selected for another Royal Tour of Australia and New Zealand in 1948. This was cancelled due to King George's declining health and Vanguard briefly became flagship of the Mediterranean Fleet in early 1949. After her return home in mid-1949, she became flagship of the Home Fleet Training Squadron. Throughout her career, the battleship usually served as the flagship of any unit to which she was assigned. During the early 1950s, Vanguard was involved in a number of training exercises with NATO forces. In 1953 she participated in Queen Elizabeth II's Coronation Review. While she was refitting in 1955, the Admiralty announced that the ship was going to be put into reserve upon completion of the work. Vanguard was sold for scrap and was broken up beginning in 1960.

Design and description
By early 1939 it was clear that the first two s could not be delivered before 1943 at the earliest and that further battleship construction would be necessary to match the German and Japanese battleships already under construction. The main constraint on the construction of any new battleships was the limited available capacity and the time required to build large-calibre guns and their gun turrets. Using four existing twin 15-inch mountings offered the possibility of bypassing this bottleneck and allowed the construction of a single fast battleship more quickly than building more Lion-class ships. The turrets were originally built for the battlecruisers  and  during the First World War, and were removed during the conversions of these ships to aircraft carriers in the 1920s. To save time, the Lion design was modified to accommodate the four turrets, and preliminary design work began in July 1939. This made Vanguard the only British battleship built with a transom stern, as the Lions were never finished.

Design work was suspended on 11 September 1939, after the start of the Second World War, but resumed in February 1940 after the First Lord of the Admiralty, Winston Churchill, expressed an interest in the ship. A small conning tower was added aft, and four Unrotated Projectile mounts were added to supplement the six octuple-barrel 2-pounder anti-aircraft mounts already planned.

More pressing commitments forced the preliminary design work to be suspended again in June; when it resumed in October the design was modified again in light of recent war experience. Greater fuel capacity was added and the armour protection improved, but these changes deepened the design's draught to beyond the  limit of the Suez Canal. This exceeded the width of the docks at Rosyth and Plymouth, which severely limited the number of docks that could handle the ship, but the changes were approved by the Board of Admiralty on 17 April 1941. The ship had already been ordered on 14 March under the 1940 Emergency War Programme, although the drawings were not turned over to John Brown & Company until ten days later.

Vanguards design was revised again, while the ship was under construction in 1942, to reflect lessons learned from the loss of the  battleship  and operations with the other battleships. This change and the relocation of some of the  ammunition handling rooms from the lower deck to the middle deck seriously delayed the ship's completion. The design requirement that the guns of 'A' turret be capable of firing straight ahead at 0° of elevation was sacrificed to allow her freeboard forward to be increased, and her bow was reshaped to make it less prone to shipping water and throwing sea spray in head seas. The Unrotated Projectile mounts were deleted from the design and the light anti-aircraft armament was increased to a total of 76 two-pounders in one quadruple, and nine octuple mounts and 24 Oerlikon 20 mm cannon were also added in 12 twin mounts. Space for these was made available by removing the two floatplanes, the catapult and their associated facilities.

A proposal was made in 1942 to convert Vanguard to an aircraft carrier. The Director of Naval Construction stated that doing so along the lines of the  would present no major difficulties but would require six months to redesign the ship. The proposal was formally rejected on 17 July.

General characteristics

The ship was significantly larger than her predecessors of the class, almost  longer and displaced about  more than the older ships at deep load.

The King George V-class ships had been built with almost no sheer to the main deck forwards to allow 'A' turret to fire straight forward at zero elevation, resulting in those ships being wet forward. Vanguard was redesigned as a result of this experience, significant sheer and flare being added to the bow. The ship's seaworthiness was well regarded, and the ship was able to keep an even keel in rough seas.

As a fleet flagship, her complement was 115 officers and 1,860 men in 1947. Air conditioning was provided for many of the ship's control spaces, and asbestos insulation was provided on exposed areas of the ship's sides, decks and bulkheads. Steam heating was provided for her armament, instruments, look-out positions and other equipment to make Vanguard suitable for operations in the Arctic. An Action Information Centre was fitted below the main armour deck with facilities to track aircraft and ships around Vanguard.

Propulsion
To save design time, the four-shaft unit machinery from the Lion-class battleship was duplicated with alternating boiler and engine rooms. Vanguard had four sets of single-reduction geared Parsons steam turbines housed in separate engine rooms. Each set consisted of one high-pressure and one low-pressure turbine, driving a propeller  in diameter. After trials, the three-bladed propellers on the inboard shafts were replaced by five-bladed propellers to reduce vibrations of the inboard propeller shafts, but this was a failure.

The ship had four  turbogenerators and four  diesel generators that supplied electricity via the common ring main at 220 volts.

Armament
The ship's main armament consisted of eight 42-calibre BL 15-inch Mk I guns in four twin hydraulically powered gun turrets, 'A', 'B', 'X' and 'Y' from bow to stern. The guns were loaded at +5°; when the turrets were modernised to the Mk I(N) RP12 design, their maximum elevation was increased from 20° to +30°. Their rate of fire was two rounds per minute. Vanguard carried 100 shells per gun.

The old 15-inch turrets had been designed when the customary practice was to place the magazine above the shell room, and it was not cost-effective to modify the ammunition hoists to accommodate the opposite arrangement, which had been adopted after the Battle of Jutland demonstrated the dangers of exposing the magazines to long-range gunfire. The ship was provided with a powder-handling room above the shell room to mimic the arrangement that the turrets' hoists were designed to handle, and another set of hoists moved the propellant charges from the magazines to the powder-handling room. The charges were stowed in cases to reduce their exposure to fire.

The secondary armament consisted of sixteen 50-calibre QF 5.25-inch Mk I* dual-purpose guns in eight twin gun mounts. They had a maximum depression of −5° and a maximum elevation of 70°. The improved RP10 spec 5.25 turrets on Vanguard were claimed to be fully automatic, with a power-rammed breech and automatic tracking and elevation under radar control enabling a rate of fire of about 18 rounds per minute.

Short-range air defence was provided by 73 Bofors 40 mm AA guns in a variety of mountings. Vanguard had ten sextuple-barrel power-operated mounts concentrated in the superstructure and stern, a twin-barrel mount on 'B' turret and 11 power-operated single mounts on the upper deck and rear superstructure. All mounts could depress to −10° and elevate to +90°. The guns' rate of fire was approximately 120 rounds per minute. Space was not available to stow the standard allowance of 1,564 rounds per gun, and Vanguard carried only 1,269 rounds per gun. Two of the single guns on the quarterdeck were removed in 1949, and five others during a major refit in 1954. All of her multiple Bofors mounts were removed at this same time.

Fire control
Vanguard was unique among British battleships in having remote power control (RPC) for her main, secondary and tertiary guns along with the Admiralty Fire Control Table Mk X for surface fire control of the main armament. There were two director control towers (DCT) for the 15-inch guns, each carrying a "double cheese" Type 274 fire-control radar for range finding and spotting the fall of shot. Each DCT could control all four turrets, 'B' turret could control 'A' and 'X' turrets, and 'X' turret could control 'Y' turret. There were four American Mark 37 DCTs for the 5.25-inch guns, each carrying the twin domes of Type 275 gunnery radar. Each Mark VI sextuple 40 mm Bofors mounting was provided with a separate CRBF ("close range blind fire") director fitted with a Type 262 radar, although the ship never mounted her complete outfit of those directors. The STAAG Mk II 40 mm Bofors mounting carried its own Type 262 on the mounting itself. Other radar sets carried were Type 960 air and surface search, Type 293 target indication and Type 277 radar height finding.

When the 15-inch gun turrets were modernised, their  rangefinders were replaced by  ones in all turrets except 'A', and they were fitted for RPC in azimuth only. The turrets were also provided with de-humidifying equipment and insulation to improve their habitability.

Protection

The ship's armour scheme was based on that of the King George V class with a thinner waterline belt and additional splinter protection. Originally the belt armour was equal to that of the older ships, but it had to be reduced to offset weight increases when the design was modified to reflect wartime experience. Fore and aft of the  transverse bulkheads that closed off the central citadel, the belt continued almost to the ends of the ship. At the aft end of the steering gear compartment was a  transverse bulkhead. After the Battle of the Denmark Strait in 1941,  non-cemented armour bulkheads were added on the sides of the magazines, to protect them from splinters from any hits from plunging shells that might have penetrated the ship's side beneath her belt.

When the gun turrets from the First World War-era battlecruisers were modernised, their KCA faceplates were replaced by new ones 13 inches thick, and their roofs were replaced by  non-cemented armour plates. Their sides remained  in thickness. The barbettes for the 15-inch guns were 13 inches thick on the sides but tapered to  closer to the centreline of the ship.

The armour continued forward and aft of the citadel at the lower-deck level. Forward it tapered in steps from five inches down to 2.5 inches near the bow. Aft, it protected the steering gear and propeller shafts with 4.5 inches of armour before tapering to a thickness of 2.5 inches near the stern. The secondary conning tower aft had  of armour on its sides.

Vanguards underwater protection was enhanced when she was redesigned in 1942 to reflect the lessons learned when Prince of Wales was sunk by Japanese torpedo bombers. It still consisted of a three-layer system of voids and liquid-filled compartments meant to absorb the energy of an underwater explosion. It was bounded on the inside by the  torpedo bulkhead. Her enlarged oil tanks reduced the empty spaces that could flood and cause the ship to list, and greater provision was made to pump these spaces out. The longitudinal bulkheads of the side protection system were raised one deck higher to further subdivide the spaces behind the waterline armour belt. Over the length of the citadel, this system was found during full-scale trials to be proof against  of TNT.

Construction and career
Vanguard was laid down on 2 October 1941 by John Brown and Company of Clydebank, Scotland, with the yard number of 567. After the Japanese invasion of Malaya in December, the ship was given an A1 priority in the hope of finishing her by the end of 1944, and construction of the light cruiser HMS Bellerophon, as well as some merchant shipping, was halted to expedite the ship's completion. This was unsuccessful, however, due to a shortage of skilled labour. As a result, it was not until 30 November 1944 that the ship was launched. Princess Elizabeth presided over this ceremony, the first ship she ever launched, and was presented with a diamond rose brooch to commemorate the event. Two yard workers were killed and six others injured when a "blinding explosion ripped" the ship in a fitting-out basin at Clydebank on 16 September 1945. Captain William Gladstone Agnew assumed command on 15 October 1945. The end of hostilities following Japan's surrender reduced the need for new warships, and consequently the ship was not commissioned until 12 May 1946. By this time, a total of £11,530,503, including £3,186,868 for the modernisation of the main armament, had been spent on producing Vanguard.

After commissioning, the ship spent several months conducting sea trials and training until August, when she began the necessary modifications to serve as a royal yacht for the forthcoming royal tour of South Africa. The Admiral's suite was reworked into accommodations for the Royal Family and their staff while the anti-aircraft mount on top of 'B' turret was replaced by a saluting platform. Agnew was promoted to rear-admiral with effect from 8 January 1947. The alterations were complete by December, and Vanguard made a shakedown cruise into the Central Atlantic and made a port visit to Gibraltar on the return voyage. Later that morning, a Sikorsky R-4 helicopter landed aboard to pick up mail and photographic film.

While the Royal Family toured the country on the first visit by a reigning monarch to South Africa, the ship exercised with ships of the South African and Royal Navies stationed there and made port visits to a number of South African cities. She sailed for home on 22 April and made brief visits to Saint Helena and Ascension Island en route. Vanguard arrived in Portsmouth on 11 May, and Captain F. R. Parham relieved the newly promoted Agnew on 29 May. In July, the ship began an overhaul in Devonport, which lasted until August 1948. While she was refitting, Vanguard was tasked to carry the Royal Family on a tour of Australia and New Zealand, planned for January 1949. On 31 August, she began a shakedown cruise to the Mediterranean and returned to Devonport on 12 November. Around this time, Vanguard was considered, along with a number of other large warships, for conversion to carry anti-aircraft missiles, but nothing further was done along these lines.

George VI was now too ill for travel, and the Royal Tour was indefinitely postponed later that month. Vanguard became the flagship of Admiral Sir Arthur Power, Commander-in-Chief of the Mediterranean Fleet, on 1 March 1949, and the ship made port visits to Algeria, France, Italy, Cyprus, Libya, Lebanon, Greece and Egypt before she arrived back at Devonport on 21 July. The newly promoted Rear Admiral Parham was relieved by Captain G. V. Gladstone a week later. The ship then became the flagship of the Home Fleet Training Squadron under Rear Admiral Edward Evans-Lombe on 12 November. While returning from a brief training sortie to Gibraltar, Vanguard went to the aid of a small French merchantman whose cargo had shifted in a severe storm on 13 February 1950. The merchantman, was taken under tow and the cargo was redistributed. Once the storm had abated, Boffa was able to resume her voyage under her own power. Vanguard reached Weymouth Bay the following day. Later, in March, she fired the salute to Vincent Auriol, the President of France, during his state visit to Great Britain.

On 13 September 1950 Admiral Sir Philip Vian hoisted his flag as Commander in Chief, Home Fleet, on Vanguard and the ship joined the rest of Home Fleet on exercises with the Royal Canadian Navy and the Mediterranean Fleet. Nearly two months later, on 10 February 1951, the aircraft carrier collided with Vanguard as the carrier docked at Gibraltar. The hole in the battleship's stern was not serious, and Vian re-hoisted his flag in Vanguard shortly afterwards. After manoeuvres with Indomitable, during which her aircraft "sank" the battleship, the ship made port visits in Genoa and Villefranche-sur-Mer before returning for a brief refit in Devonport on 14 March. After completing her refit in May, she became flagship of the Home Fleet Training Squadron under Rear Admiral R. M. Dick at the Isle of Portland. Four months later the admiral transferred his flag to the carrier  as Vanguard began another refit in preparation to again become the flagship of Home Fleet.

Buckingham Palace announced in November that King George VI was planning to take a short cruise for his health aboard Vanguard, which meant that her Admiral's suite again had to be modified to accommodate him and his staff. Captain John Litchfield assumed command on 21 December while the ship was still refitting, but the King died on 6 February 1952 before he could make his cruise. A detachment from the ship participated in his funeral procession before she departed for her post-refit shakedown cruise on 22 February. After exercising with Implacable, Indomitable and the fast minelayer , Vanguard returned home on 29 March. She became flagship of Home Fleet again on 13 May when Admiral Sir George Creasy hoisted his flag. Due to manning and weight problems, Vanguard operated with many of her turrets unmanned and with ammunition carried for only two of the 15-inch turrets and only starshell ammunition for the 5.25-inch guns. She participated in exercises with the Dutch and American navies, before returning to Portsmouth for the holidays. Litchfield was relieved by Captain R. A. Ewing on 19 January 1953; the ship departed the next day for a brief refit at Gibraltar. After its completion on 2 March, the ship trained with several of the Royal Navy's carriers before arriving back at Portsmouth on 25 March. Vanguard participated in Queen Elizabeth's Coronation Fleet Review at Spithead on 15 June 1953. The following September, she participated in NATO's Exercise Mariner in the Denmark Strait.

Admiral Sir Michael Denny replaced Creasy as Commander-in-Chief, Home Fleet, on 5 January 1954 and Vanguard participated in Exercise Medflex A with Dutch and French ships in March. During the rest of the year she participated in anti-submarine and anti-aircraft exercises as well as making port visits to Oslo and Kristiansand in Norway and Helsingborg in Sweden. She was inspected on 11 July by King Gustaf VI Adolf of Sweden before returning home later that month. Denny struck his flag on 15 September, and Vanguard sailed to Devonport for a £220,000 refit 10 days later. The February 1955 Defence Estimates had intended her as the Home Fleet flagship with a role as a  killer, but after the appointment of Earl Mountbatten in April 1955 and with Antony Eden replacing Churchill as prime minister, the government decided instead to maintain two extra cruisers in the fleet, and Vanguard was placed in reserve when it completed its 1955 refit. She subsequently became the flagship of the Reserve Fleet when Vice Admiral Richard Onslow hoisted his flag on 28 November. While moored in Fareham Creek, during her time in the reserve fleet, waterline shots of Vanguard in Portsmouth Harbour were filmed for the title sequence of the 1957 comedy film Carry on Admiral. Just before decommissioning, scenes for the 1960 film Sink the Bismarck! were filmed aboard, with Vanguard being used to depict interiors of the bridges, Admiral's Quarters and gun turrets for Hood, Bismarck and King George V.

Decommissioning and fate 
On 9 October 1959 the Admiralty announced that Vanguard would be scrapped, as she was considered obsolete and too expensive to maintain. She was decommissioned on 7 June 1960 and sold to BISCO for £560,000. On 4 August 1960, when the ship was scheduled to be towed from Portsmouth to the breaker's yard at Faslane, Scotland, the whole of the Southsea sea front was packed with people who came to see her off. As Vanguard was being towed towards the harbour entrance, she slewed across the harbour and ran aground near the Still & West pub. She was pulled off by five tugboats an hour later, and after nearly running aground again near the Moving & East pub on the opposite shore, made her final exit from Portsmouth. Five days later she arrived at Faslane, and by mid-1962 the demolition process was complete. She was the last British battleship to be scrapped.

As a part of the scrapping process, sections of  pre-atomic steel plate uncontaminated with radionuclides were recovered from Vanguard and used for the shielding of the whole body monitor at the Radiobiological Research Laboratory (now DSTL) at Alverstoke, Gosport in Hampshire, England.

The process of decommissioning was filmed by the Rank Organisation for their Look at Life film series in an episode entitled The Last Battleship.

Notes and references

Bibliography

Further reading

External links

 The Gunnery Pocket Book
 HMS Vanguard website
 Maritimequest HMS Vanguard Photo Gallery
 

1944 ships
Battleships of the Royal Navy
Ships built on the River Clyde
Cold War battleships of the United Kingdom
Maritime incidents in 1960